Friends is the fourth Mini-Album for the Japanese rock duo B'z, released in 1992. The album sold 1,355,530 copies and reached No. 1 at Oricon. The track "Itsuka no Merry Christmas" became extremely commercially successful, being certified by the RIAJ as being downloaded 500,000+ times as a ringtone and more than 100,000 times as a full-length cellphone download, despite being released in the early 1990s and not as a single.

Track listing 
Prologue - Friends 1:48
 - 5:03
Scene 2 - Boku no Tsumi (僕の罪) - 4:19
Love is... - 1:26
Scene 3 - Koi ja Naku Naru Hi (恋じゃなくなる日) - 4:51
Scene 4 - Seasons - 1:14
Scene 5 - Dōshitemo Kimi o Ushinaitakunai (どうしても君を失いたくない) - 6:07
Itsuka no Merry Christmas (Reprise) (いつかのメリークリスマス (Reprise)) - 1:23

Certifications

References 

Concept albums
1992 EPs
B'z EPs
Japanese-language EPs